Puzrish-Dagan (modern Drehem) is an important archaeological site in Al-Qādisiyyah Governorate (Iraq). It is best-known for the thousands of clay tablets that are known to have come from the site through looting during the early twentieth century.

History of research 
Puzrish-Dagan came first to the attention of scholars when clay tablets coming from the site started to appear on the antiquities market in 1909-1910. Based on information from the antiquities traders who sold the tablets, Puzrish-Dagan could be identied with modern Drehem in Iraq. Since then, some 12,000 tablets thought to have come from the site have been published. The objects are scattered across numerous collections, for example those of the Royal Ontario Museum, the Oriental Institute, Harvard Museum, and the Iraq Museum.

The site was surveyed by Robert McCormick Adams as part of his important archaeological work in the region. Iraqi archaeologists excavated the site in 2007 under the direction of Ali Ubeid Shalkam. The Iraqi-Italian QADIS-project surveyed the site in 2016. From 2016 to 2019 the University of Bologna and the Iraqi State Board of Antiquities and Heritage conducted a program of coordinated remote sensing and surface surveys in the Qadisiyah province including at Drehem. It determined that the site had an extent of 60 hectares. It determined that the city was surrounded by canals, was laid out as an urban grid, had a number of administrative building, and had a harbor.

The Oriental Institute has received permission to start new excavations at the site as part of their renewed work at the nearby site of Nippur and carried out a preliminary survey in 2019.

The site and its environment 
The site consists of two areas; a northern and a southern mound. Parts of the site are now obscured by modern agricultural fields and several irrigation canals cut through it. The mound has been described as a "beehive" due to the illegal looting taking place since the early 1900s.

Based on the site morphology, the southern mound possibly contains a ziggurat. Traces of the walls are still visible on the surface and the regularity of these traces suggests that the buildings were planned and built within a short period of time. The QADIS-survey has documented possible traces of a city wall, a large temple complex next to the ziggurat, ancient canals that ran alongside and through the settlement, as well as a harbor.

Occupation history 
Traces of the Early Dynastic, Akkadian and Ur III periods have been found at the site according to a 1967 publication of the Iraqi Directorate General of antiquities. The QADIS-survey found sherds dating to the Middle Uruk period and confirmed that the Ur III period was probably the most important settlement level at Drehem. Evidence for the Isin-Larsa as well as the Parthian and/or Sasanian periods has also been found. The thousands of texts coming from the site all date to the Ur III period. In the absence of excavations these texts from provide the most information on the nature of the settlement at Drehem. Puzrish-Dagan was founded by king Shulgi as an important administrative center in the bala tax system of the Ur III period. Witnessed by thousands of cuneiform tablets, livestock (cattle, sheep, and goats) of the state was centralized at Drehem and subsequently redistributed to temples, its officials and royal palaces. The temples of nearby Nippur were the main destinations of the livestock.

References 

Al-Qādisiyyah Governorate
Archaeological sites in Iraq